The 2019 Maryland Terrapins baseball team was a baseball team that represented University of Maryland, College Park in the 2019 NCAA Division I baseball season. The Terrapins were members of the Big Ten Conference (B1G) and played their home games at Shipley Field in College Park, Maryland. They were led by second-year head coach Rob Vaughn.

Previous season
The Terrapins finished the 2018 NCAA Division I baseball season 24–30 overall (9–14 conference) and ninth place in conference standings, failing to qualify for the Conference Tournament or the NCAA tournament.

MLB draft 
The following Terrapins on the 2018 roster were selected in the 2018 Major League Baseball draft:

Roster

Schedule

! style="" | Regular Season
|- valign="top" 

|- bgcolor="#ffcccc"
| 1 || February 15 || vs  || Springs Brooks Stadium • Conway, South Carolina, || 6–10 || Messer (1–0) || Zoellner (0–1) || None || 205 || 0–1 || 0–0
|- bgcolor="#ffcccc"
| 2 || February 16 || at #21 Coastal Carolina || Springs Brooks Stadium • Conway, South Carolina || 2–7 || Veneziano (1–0) || Thmopson (0–1) || None || 1,611 || 0–2 || 0–0
|- bgcolor="#ccffcc"
| 3 || February 17 || at VCU || Springs Brooks Stadium • Conway, South Carolina || 5–3 || Turnball (1–0) || Ryan (0–1) || Murphy (1) || 271 || 1–2 || 0–0
|- bgcolor="#ccffcc"
| 4 || February 22 ||  || Shipley Field • College Park, Maryland || 4–0 || Parsons (1–0) || Sinacola (0–1) || None || 589 || 2–2 || 0–0
|- bgcolor="#ccffcc"
| 5 || February 22 || Maine || Shipley Field • College Park, Maryland || 5–3 || Thompson (1–1) || Kemble (0–1) || Turnbull (1) || 589 || 3–2 || 0–0
|- bgcolor="#ccffcc"
| 6 || February 24 || Maine || Shipley Field • College Park, Maryland || 9–6 || Glock (1–0) || Geoffrion (0–1) || Murphy (2) || 488 || 4–2 || 0–0
|- bgcolor="#ffcccc"
| 7 || February 26 || at VCU || The Diamond • Richmond, Virginia, || 4–3 || Turnbull (2–0) || Dum (0–1) || Murphy (3) || 274 || 5–2 || 0–0
|-

|- bgcolor="#ccffcc"
| 8 || March 1 || at Louisiana || M. L. Tigue Moore Field at Russo Park • Lafayette, Louisiana, || 4–2 || Parsons (2–0) || Leger (0–1) || Murphy (4) || 4,668 || 6–2 || 0–0
|- bgcolor="#ffcccc"
| 9 || March 2 || at Louisiana || M. L. Tigue Moore Field at Russo Park • Lafayette, Louisiana || 3–4 || Cooke (1–0) || Fisher (0–1) || None || 4,502 || 6–3 || 0–0
|- bgcolor="#ffcccc"
| 10 || March 2 || at Louisiana || M. L. Tigue Moore Field at Russo Park • Lafayette, Louisiana || 1–2 || Schultz (1–0) || Heine (0–1) || None || 4,528 || 6–4 || 0–0
|- bgcolor="#ccffcc"
| 11 || March 5 ||  || Shipley Field • College Park, Maryland || 11–6 || O'Connor (1–0) || Silan (0–1) || None || 261 || 7–4 || 0–0
|- bgcolor="#ccffcc"
| 12 || March 8 || at  || Melching Field at Conrad Park • DeLand, Florida, || 7–0 || Parsons (3–0) || Peto (0–2) || None || 752 || 8–4 || 0–0
|- bgcolor="#ffcccc"
| 13 || March 9 || at Stetson || Melching Field at Conrad Park • DeLand, Florida || 7–12 || Neilan (1–0) || Zoellner (0–2) || Nunez (2) || 703 || 8–5 || 0–0
|- bgcolor="#ccffcc"
| 14 || March 10 || at Stetson || Melching Field at Conrad Park • DeLand, Florida || 8–4 || LaBonte (1–0) || Bogart (0–1) || None || 722 || 9–5 || 0–0
|- bgcolor="#ccffcc"
| 15 || March 13 || at Delaware || Bob Hannah Stadium • Newark, Delaware || 11–6 || Glock (2–0) || Dubecq (0–1) || None || 180 || 10–5 || 0–0
|- bgcolor="#ffcccc"
| 16 || March 15 ||  || Shipley Field • College Park, Maryland || 0–9 || Agnos (3–1) || Parsons (3–1) || None || 850 || 10–6 || 0–0
|- bgcolor="#ffcccc"
| 17 || March 16 || East Carolina || Shipley Field • College Park, Maryland || 1–2 || Smith (2–0) || Thompson (1–2) || Burleson (1) || 915 || 10–7 || 0–0
|- bgcolor="#ffcccc"
| 18 || March 17 || East Carolina || Shipley Field • College Park, Maryland || 0–3 || Kuchmaner (2–0) || LaBonte (1–1) || None || 823 || 10–8 || 0–0
|- bgcolor="#ccffcc"
| 19 || March 19 || at || Walter C. Latham Park • Elon, North Carolina, || 11–4 || Glock (3–0) || Galbraith (0–1) || None || 177 || 11–8 || 0–0
|- bgcolor="#ccffcc"
| 20 || March 20 || at Elon || Walter C. Latham Park • Elon, North Carolina || 12–4 || Tucker (1–0) || Albrittain (0–1) || None || 215 || 12–8 || 0–0
|- bgcolor="#ffcccc"
| 21 || March 22 ||  || Shipley Field • College Park, Maryland || 2–3 || Ragan (3–1) || Parsons (3–2) || Kametas (3) || 264 || 12–9 || 0–0
|- bgcolor="#ffcccc"
| 22 || March 23 || Creighton || Shipley Field • College Park, Maryland || 3–5 || Smith (3–0) || DiLuia (0–1) || None || 419 || 12–10 || 0–0
|- bgcolor="#ffcccc"
| 23 || March 24 || Creighton || Shipley Field • College Park, Maryland || 6–8 || Johnson (2–0) || LaBonte (1–3) || TeBrake (1) || 509 || 12–11 || 0–0
|- bgcolor="#ccffcc"
| 24 || March 29 || Indiana || Shipley Field • College Park, Maryland || 2–0 || Parsons (4–2) || Milto (4–2) || Murphy (5) || 571 || 13–11 || 1–0
|- bgcolor="#ffcccc"
| 25 || March 30 || Indiana || Shipley Field • College Park, Maryland || 5–20 || Gordon (3–3) || Thompson (1–3) || None || 899 || 13–12 || 1–1
|- bgcolor="#ffcccc"
| 26 || March 31 || Indiana || Shipley Field • College Park, Maryland || 4–19 || Saalfrank (2–1) || LaBonte (1–3) || None || 534 || 13–13 || 1–2
|-

|- bgcolor="#ffcccc"
| 27 || April 2 ||  || Plumeri Park • Williamsburg, Virginia, || 1–8 || Haney (3–2) || Tucker (1–1) || None || 333 || 13–14 || 1–2
|- bgcolor="#ccffcc"
| 28 || April 5 || at  || Illinois Field • Champaign, Illinois, || 4–2 || Parsons (5–2) || Acton (1–1) || Murphy (6) || 760 || 14–14 || 2–2
|- bgcolor="#ffcccc"
| 29 || April 6 || at Illinois || Illinois Field • Champaign, Illinois || 1–5 || Weber (2–1) || Thompson (1–4) || None || 2,768 || 14–15 || 2–3
|- bgcolor="#ccffcc"
| 30 || April 6 || at Illinois || Illinois Field • Champaign, Illinois || 8–4 || Vail (1–0) || Schmitt (3–1) || None || 2,768 || 15–15 || 3–3
|- bgcolor="#ccffcc"
| 31 || April 9 || William & Mary || Shipley Field • College Park, Maryland || 16–10 || DiLuia (1–1) || Cone (1–1) || None || 409 || 16–15 || 3–3
|- bgcolor="#ffcccc"
| 32 || April 10 ||  || Shipley Field • College Park, Maryland || 1–8 || Snyder (5–1) || Turnbull (2–1) || None || 514 || 16–16 || 3–3
|- bgcolor="#ccffcc"
| 33 || April 12 || at  || Rocky Miller Park • Evanston, Illinois, || 13–8 || Parsons (6–2) || Lavelle (3–4) || None || 264 || 17–16 || 4–3
|- bgcolor="#ffcccc"
| 34 || April 13 || at Northwestern || Rocky Miller Park • Evanston, Illinois || 7–13 || Paciorek (2–1) || Vail (1–1) || None || 298 || 17–17 || 4–4
|- bgcolor="#ccffcc"
| 35 || April 13 || at Northwestern || Rocky Miller Park • Evanston, Illinois || 12–10 || DiLuia (2–1) || Alepra (0–2) || Murphy (7) || 376 || 18–17 || 5–4
|- bgcolor="#ffcccc"
| 36 || April 16 ||  || Shipley Field • College Park, Maryland || 1–14 || Bechtold (2–1) || Heine (0–2) || None || 378 || 18–18 || 5–4
|- bgcolor="#ffcccc"
| 37 || April 17 || at  || Spuhler Field • Fairfax, Virginia, || 5–9 || Halligan (3–3) || Wilden (0–1) || None || 162 || 18–19 || 5–4
|- bgcolor="#ccffcc"
| 38 || April 20 ||  || Shipley Field • College Park, Maryland || 14–8 || Parsons (7–2) || Burhenn (5–2) || Fisher (1) || 1,073 || 19–19 || 6–4
|- bgcolor="#ffcccc"
| 39 || April 20 || Ohio State || Shipley Field • College Park, Maryland || 9–10 || Magno (3–3) || Murphy (0–1) || None || 1,073 || 19–20 || 6–5
|- bgcolor="#ffcccc"
| 40 || April 21 || Ohio State || Shipley Field • College Park, Maryland || 1–5 || Smith (4–2) || LaBonte (1–4) || None || 515 || 19–21 || 6–6
|- bgcolor="#ccffcc"
| 41 || April 23 || VCU || Shipley Field • College Park, Maryland || 10–5 || Fisher (1–1) || Watson (3–1) || None || 431 || 20–21 || 6–6
|- bgcolor="#ccffcc"
| 42 || April 26 || at  || Medlar Field • University Park, Pennsylvania || 5–2 || Parsons (8–2) || Biasi (3–4) || Murphy (8) || 393 || 21–21 || 7–6
|- bgcolor="#ccffcc"
| 43 || April 27 || Penn State || Medlar Field • University Park, Pennsylvania || 6–4 || Thompson (2–4) || Mock (2–3) || Murphy (9) || 710 || 22–21 || 8–6
|- bgcolor="#ffcccc"
| 44 || April 27 || Penn State || Medlar Field • University Park, Pennsylvania || 7–10 || Mellott (2–3) || LaBonte (1–5) || Virbitsky (3) || 710 || 22–22 || 8–7
|-

|- bgcolor="#ccffcc"
| 45 || May 1 || at  || Villanova Ballpark at Plymouth • Plymouth Meeting, Pennsylvania || 5–2 || Blohm (1–0) || Toohers (0–1) || Vail (1) || 283 || 23–22 || 8–7
|- bgcolor="#ffcccc"
| 46 || May 3 || Michigan || Shipley Field • College Park, Maryland || 7–10 || Kauffmann (8–3) || Parsons (8–3) || Weiss (9) || 633 || 23–23 || 8–8
|- bgcolor="#ffcccc"
| 47 || May 4 || Michigan || Shipley Field • College Park, Maryland || 4–10 || Henry (8–3) || Thompson (2–5) || None || 817 || 23–24 || 8–9
|- bgcolor="#ffcccc"
| 48 || May 5 || Michigan || Shipley Field • College Park, Maryland || 1–13 || Criswell (5–1) || LaBonte (1–6) || None || 185 || 23–25 || 8–10
|- bgcolor="#ccffcc"
| 49 || May 10 || at  || Siebert Field • Minneapolis, Minnesota || 7–3 || Parsons (9–3) || Lackney (2–4) || None || 530 || 24–25 || 9–10
|- bgcolor="#ffcccc"
| 50 || May 11 || at Minnesota || Siebert Field • Minneapolis, Minnesota || 3–9 || Horton (1–0) || Thompson (2–6) || None || 536 || 24–26 || 9–11
|- bgcolor="#ffcccc"
| 51 || May 12 || at Minnesota || Siebert Field • Minneapolis, Minnesota || 1–2 || Culliver (3–4) || Blohm (1–1) || Schulze (6) || 618 || 24–27 || 9–12
|- bgcolor="#ccffcc"
| 52 || May 14 || at James Madison || Eagle Field at Veterans Memorial Park • Harrisonburg, Virginia, || 6–5 || Fisher (2–1) || Jones (2–1) || Murphy (10) || 247 || 25–27 || 9–12
|- bgcolor="#ccffcc"
| 53 || May 16 ||  || Shipley Field • College Park, Maryland || 8–6 || Murphy (1–1) || Leonard (2–2) || None || 630 || 26–27 || 10–12
|- bgcolor="#ccffcc"
| 54 || May 17|| Iowa || Shipley Field • College Park, Maryland || 8–4 || Thompson (3–6) || Baumann (4–4) || None || 825 || 27–27 || 11–12
|- bgcolor="#ccffcc"
| 55 || May 18 || Iowa || Shipley Field • College Park, Maryland || 10–8 || Vail (2–1) || Leonard (2–3) || Murphy (11) || 939 || 28–27 || 12–12
|-

|-
! style="" | Postseason
|- valign="top" 

|- align="center" bgcolor=
|- bgcolor="#ccffcc"
| 56 || May 22 || vs Illinois || TD Ameritrade Park • Omaha, Nebraska, || 6–2 || Parsons (10–3) || Leland (6–3) || None || - || 29–27 || 12-12
|- bgcolor="#ffcccc"
| 57 || May 23 || vs Ohio State || TD Ameritrade Park Omaha • Omaha, Nebraska || 2–3 || Smith (6–4) || DiLuia (2–2) || Magno (12) || – || 29–28 || 12–12
|- bgcolor="#ffcccc"
| 58 || May 25 || vs Michigan || TD Ameritrade Park Omaha • Omaha, Nebraska || 4–10 || Henry (9–5) || Blohm (1–2) || None || – || 29–29 || 12–12
|-

Awards

Conference awards

See also
 2019 Big Ten Conference baseball tournament

References

Maryland
Maryland Terrapins baseball seasons
Maryland